Picoto da Melriça is a monument and the geodesic centre of mainland Portugal. Despite being the geodesic centre, it is not the geometric centre of mainland Portugal, which is located in the neighboring Mação.

Predating the construction of the monument, Francisco António Ciera, a mathematician and cartographer was commanded by Maria I of Portugal to create a triangulation of the Kingdom of Portugal, a job he delegated from 1788 to 1803. The construction of the station took place in 1802.

A museum (Museu da Geodesia) was created in 2002 next to the monument.

References

Geography of Portugal